Anita Diamant (born June 27, 1951) is an American author of fiction and non-fiction books.  She has published five novels, the most recent of which is The Boston Girl, a New York Times best seller. She is best known for her 1997 novel The Red Tent, which eventually became a best seller and book club favorite. She has also written six guides to contemporary Jewish practice, including The New Jewish Wedding, Living a Jewish Life, and The New Jewish Baby Book, as well as a collection of personal essays, Pitching My Tent.

Early life and education 

Diamant spent her early childhood in Newark, New Jersey, and moved to Denver, Colorado, when she was 12 years old. She attended the University of Colorado Boulder and transferred to Washington University in St. Louis, where she earned a bachelor's degree in Comparative Literature in 1973. She then earned a master's degree in English from Binghamton University in 1975.

Career 

Diamant started her writing career in 1975 as a freelance journalist.  Her articles have been published in the Boston Globe magazine, Parenting magazine, New England Monthly, Yankee, Self, Parents, McCall's, and Ms.

Her first book was The New Jewish Wedding, published in 1985, and has since published five other guidebooks about contemporary Jewish practice. Her debut as a fiction writer came in 1997 with The Red Tent, followed by the novels, Good Harbor and The Last Days of Dogtown. The latter is an account of life in a dying Cape Ann, Massachusetts village, Dogtown, in the early 19th century.

Her next novel, Day After Night (2009), tells the stories of four women survivors of the Holocaust who, in the period following the end of the war and before the founding of the State of Israel, find themselves detained in the Atlit detention center, just south of Haifa, in the British Mandate of Palestine.

In 2014 she published the novel The Boston Girl, a coming-of-age story about an immigrant girl in the early 20th century.

Personal life

Diamant is the founding president of Mayyim Hayyim: Living Waters Community Mikveh and Education Center, a community-based ritual bath in Newton, Massachusetts.

She lives in Newton, Massachusetts, is married, and has one daughter.

Bibliography

Novels 

 The Red Tent"  (1997)
 Good Harbor (2001)
 The Last Days of Dogtown (2005)
 Day After Night (2009)
 The Boston Girl (2014)

 Nonfiction 

 Period. End of Sentence: The New Chapter in the Fight for Menstrual Justice (2021) 

Autobiography
 Pitching My Tent: On Marriage, Motherhood, Friendship, and Other Leaps of Faith (2003)

Guides
 The Jewish Wedding Now" (2017, revised edition of "The New Jewish Wedding published in 1985 and revised 2001)
 The New Jewish Baby Book (1988, revised 2005)
 What to Name Your Jewish Baby (1989)
 Living a Jewish Life (1991, revised 2007, with Howard Cooper)
 Bible Baby Names: Spiritual Choices from Judeo-Christian Sources (1996)
 Saying Kaddish: How to Comfort the Dying, Bury the Dead, and Mourn as a Jew (1998, Revised 2019)
 Choosing a Jewish Life: A Handbook for People Converting to Judaism and for Their Family and Friends (Revised, 2020, first published 1998)
 How to Raise a Jewish Child: A Practical Handbook for Family Life (2000, with Karen Kushner)* 

Journalism
 Life and Death in the Nursery (1985)

Notes

Further reading
 

External links
 
 "Holding Up Half the Sky: Feminist Judaism" by Anita Diamant on Patheos''
 Mayyim Hayyim Home Page

1951 births
Living people
American family and parenting writers
20th-century American novelists
Jewish women writers
Washington University in St. Louis alumni
Binghamton University alumni
Jewish American novelists
21st-century American novelists
20th-century American women writers
21st-century American women writers
American women novelists
American women non-fiction writers
21st-century American non-fiction writers